Charles Pym may refer to:

Sir Charles Pym, 1st Baronet (1615–1671)
Charles Guy Pym (1841–1918), MP for Bedford 1895
Sir Charles Pym, 2nd Baronet (1664–1688) of the Pym baronets